Loyola Hearn,  (born March 25, 1943) is a Canadian diplomat and former politician. Hearn is the former Canadian Ambassador to Ireland. He served as a Member of the House of Commons of Canada from 2000 to 2008, and as Minister of Fisheries and Oceans from February 6, 2006 to October 30, 2008.

Biography

Early life
Hearn was born in the fishing village of Renews, Newfoundland, where he received his early education. After graduating from high school, he began his studies at Memorial University of Newfoundland and the University of New Brunswick.

Career
After graduating from the university, he started a teaching career in Renews. Hearn then served in the Newfoundland House of Assembly from 1982 to 1993, and served as Minister of Education from 1985 to 1989. Hearn was a candidate in the 1989 Progressive Conservative Leadership Convention to replace outgoing Premier Brian Peckford, the eventual winner was Tom Rideout.

Hearn went on to enter federal politics and was a member of the Conservative Party of Canada in the House of Commons of Canada, representing the riding of St. John's West from 2000 to 2003 and St. John's South—Mount Pearl from 2003 to 2008. He was a member of the Progressive Conservative Party of Canada from 2000 to 2004, and was active in representing the party during its merger discussions with the Canadian Alliance. Those discussions culminated in the merger of the two parties in December 2003, to the Conservative Party of Canada. Hearn served as the first House Leader of the newly created party until it had its first leadership convention.

He has served (either before or after the merger) as the Progressive Conservative Party House Leader, Conservative Party House Leader, Opposition House Leader, Canadian Heritage Critic, Public Works and Government Services Critic, and Critic of the Leader of the Government in the House of Commons.

Following his victory in the 2006 federal election he was named Minister of Fisheries and Oceans on February 6, 2006. As Minister of Fisheries and Oceans, Hearn has been active in defending the controversial east coast seal hunt. In this role, he claimed that several observers from the Humane Society of the United States had been arrested for illegal activity during their campaign against the seal hunt, but was later forced to apologize under threat of a libel suit as no arrests had in fact taken place.

Hearn has also had to deal with the crises in several rural Newfoundland communities involving the sale of fish plants by Fishery Products International to Ocean Choice, often being in conflict with the provincial government, business and unions.

A few days prior to the dissolution of Parliament in September 2008, Hearn announced that he would not stand for re-election in the 2008 election.

Ambassador to Ireland
On November 19, 2010, Lawrence Cannon, Canada's Minister of Foreign Affairs, announced the appointment of Hearn as Canada's Ambassador to Ireland, succeeding Pat Binns. Hearn's term as ambassador ended on January 19, 2015 and was replaced by Kevin Vickers.

In 2018, Hearn endorsed Ches Crosbie in the 2018 provincial PC leadership race.

Hearn endorsed Peter Mackay in the 2020 Conservative Party of Canada leadership election.

Personal life
Hearn has a son, David (January 1979), and a daughter, Laurita (February 1976), with his wife, Maureen Hearn.

Electoral record

|- bgcolor="white"
! align="right" colspan="3" | Turnout
! align="right" | 37,371
! align="right" | 58.3%
! align="right" | +5.7%

References

External links
 

1943 births
Members of the House of Commons of Canada from Newfoundland and Labrador
Education ministers of Newfoundland and Labrador
Conservative Party of Canada MPs
Progressive Conservative Party of Canada MPs
Members of the 28th Canadian Ministry
Members of the King's Privy Council for Canada
Living people
Progressive Conservative Party of Newfoundland and Labrador MHAs
Ambassadors of Canada to Ireland
Memorial University of Newfoundland alumni
University of New Brunswick alumni
People from Renews-Cappahayden